Friends' School, Lisburn is a Quaker voluntary grammar school in the city of Lisburn, Northern Ireland, founded in 1774.

History
Friends’ School Lisburn was founded – as The Ulster Provincial School – on the basis of a bequest in 1764 of a prosperous linen merchant, John Hancock, who left £1,000 for the purchase of land in or near Lisburn on which to build a school for the children of Quakers.   at Prospect Hill were purchased from the Earl of Hertford. In 1774, the first headmaster, John Gough, took up his post. In 1794 The Ulster Provincial School became the responsibility of the Ulster Quarterly Meeting, the body representing the Religious Society of Friends in Ulster.

Friends' is one of two Quaker schools in Ireland, the other being Newtown School, Waterford. There are eight in the United Kingdom.

The school has been named by  The Sunday Times as Northern Ireland Secondary School of the Year on two occasions: first in 2011 and then in 2017.

Principals

Composition

The school consists of a fee-paying preparatory department, Prospect House, and a grammar school, the latter of which had, until the early 2000s, a boarding department attracting pupils from abroad (mostly Hong Kong). Friends' now only accepts day pupils, with an admissions number of 140 a year contributing to a full enrolment of 970 for the grammar school.

The original school house is no longer standing, but the date stone from it is displayed in Middle House, a building dating from 1880, which was refurbished in 2015. The latest addition to the school was the East Suite, a teaching building opened in 2016. It stands in place of the old basketball court, which was previously the location of the swimming pool. The swimming pool was reputed to be the oldest heated pool in Ireland (1901), and used to stand beside Harding House, a temporary teaching building which was demolished to make space for the East Suite.
The school has five tennis courts and three rugby pitches. A sports hall was opened in 2000 and two floodlit, sand-dressed hockey pitches were laid in 2013. As well as hosting school fixtures, these pitches are home to South Antrim Hockey Club.

Notable former pupils

 Wallace Arthur, biologist and author
 Michael Dibdin, author
 Stephen Ferris, rugby player for Ulster, Ireland, British and Irish Lions
 Keith Getty, musician and hymn writer
 Bulmer Hobson, leading member of Irish Volunteers and Irish Republican Brotherhood 
Florence Fulton Hobson, first licensed female architect in Ireland 
 Jimmy Kirkwood, Gold medal winning Olympic hockey player (Team GB, Seoul 1988)
 Robert Moore, first-class cricketer
 Gareth Murdock, musician and current bass guitarist of Alestorm
 Frank Pantridge CBE, cardiologist, inventor of the portable defibrillator
 Alastair Ross, former Member of the Northern Ireland Assembly (2007–2017), former Northern Ireland Executive Office Minister
Theo Snoddy, art historian
Sir William Tyrrell (1885-1968), physician and athlete.

See also
 List of Friends schools

References

External links
 Friends' School Lisburn website

1774 establishments in Ireland
Co-educational boarding schools
Friends' School
Lisburn
Quaker schools in Northern Ireland